Parliamentary elections were held in QwaQwa between 19 and 21 March 1975. The Dikwankwetla Party won 19 of the 20 elected seats.

Electoral system
The Legislative Assembly had a total of 60 seats, 20 of which were elected and 40 of which were reserved for tribal representatives; 26 from the Koena tribe and 14 from the Tlokwa tribe.

Results

References

QwaQwa
Elections in South African bantustans
QwaQwa
March 1975 events in Africa